Gelgelab (also Romanized as Gelgelāb; also known as Kal Kalāb) is a village in Khvoresh Rostam-e Shomali Rural District, Khvoresh Rostam District, Khalkhal County, Ardabil Province, Iran. At the 2006 census, its population was 81, in 24 families. Popular places to visit in Gelgelab are Kivi Zaviyeh, Seqarchi, Seh Rah-e Gahraz, Zaviyeh, Gelgelab and Hashatjin.

References 

Towns and villages in Khalkhal County